Əvəcük (also, Evadzhuk and Evedzhyuk) is a village and municipality in the Qusar Rayon of Azerbaijan.  It has a population of 863.

References 

Populated places in Qusar District